Richard Vargas (born 28 December 1994) is a male Venezuelan racewalker. He competed in the 20 kilometres walk event at the 2015 World Championships in Athletics in Beijing, China. In 2019, he competed in the men's 20 kilometres walk at the 2019 World Athletics Championships held in Doha, Qatar. He did not finish his race.

See also
 Venezuela at the 2015 World Championships in Athletics

References

Venezuelan male racewalkers
Living people
Place of birth missing (living people)
1994 births
World Athletics Championships athletes for Venezuela
Athletes (track and field) at the 2016 Summer Olympics
Olympic athletes of Venezuela
Athletes (track and field) at the 2019 Pan American Games
Pan American Games competitors for Venezuela
20th-century Venezuelan people
21st-century Venezuelan people